Andreyevka is a rural locality (a selo) and the administrative center of Andreyevskoye Rural Settlement, Nizhnedevitsky District, Voronezh Oblast, Russia. The population was 360 as of 2010. There are 11 streets.

Geography 
Andreyevka is located 38 km northeast of Nizhnedevitsk (the district's administrative centre) by road. Izbishche is the nearest rural locality.

References 

Rural localities in Nizhnedevitsky District